A Dictionary of Musical Themes (New York: Crown, 1949) is a reference book by Sam Morgenstern and Harold Barlow.

Background 
The book collects together 10,000 musical themes (mostly classical works) and indexes them using a notation index based on transposing the pitches to C major or C minor (so that God Save the Queen/America, for instance, would come out as CCDBCDEEFE). It was followed a year later by A Dictionary of Vocal Themes (1950), including themes from songs and opera.

Sam Morgenstern (1906-1989) was a teacher at Mannes College of Music in Greenwich Village, New York, and the conductor of Lower Manhattan's Lemonade Opera Company, which gave the US premiere of Prokofiev’s Duenna in 1948. He composed two short operas himself, along with Warsaw Ghetto (setting a spoken word poem by Harry Granick to background music), which was premiered at Carnegie Hall on February 10, 1946. He also composed a choral cantata The Common Man, and the latin-tinged piano piece Toccata Guatemala. Although there are no recordings of his work, a radio disk transcription of the second performance of Warsaw Ghetto exists, made in the studio a week after the premiere.  Morgenstern’s other books included the anthology Composers on Music (1956).

Co-author Harold Barlow (1915-93), who devised the notation scheme, was a popular song composer who studied violin at Boston University and went on to become a bandleader during World War II. He wrote the comedy song I’ve Got Tears in My Ears in 1949 (recorded by Homer and Jethro), and the lyrics to the 1960 Connie Francis hit Mama. But Barlow became better known later in his career as a consultant on plagiarism, most famously defending George Harrison’s My Sweet Lord against accusations that it was copied from the Chiffons’ hit He’s So Fine. (Harrison still lost the case). Barlow also worked on cases involving Bob Dylan, Elvis Presley, Elton John, Dolly Parton and Billy Joel.

Alternative classification
A new attempt at classifying tunes was published in 1975 by Denys Parsons. The Directory of Tunes and Musical Themes used the contours of a melody, avoiding the need to transpose the notes into C (which involves some musical knowledge). Using the letters U, D and R to denote up, down and repeat, and an asterisk for the first note, “God Save the Queen” comes out as *RUDUU URUDDD UDDU. Parsons covered around 15,000 classical, popular and folk pieces in his dictionary. In the process he found out that *UU is the most popular opening contour, used in 23% of all the themes, something that applies to all the genres.  The book was reissued in 2008 as the Directory of Classical Themes.

Denys Parsons (1914, died circa 2000) was the grandson of the famous actor Sir Herbert Beerbohm Tree, initially a scientist, then a filmmaker, and from 1933-80 the press officer for the British Library – as well as a talented pianist and flautist. He was also the father of Alan Parsons, the producer of Pink Floyd's Dark Side of the Moon and leader of the Alan Parsons Project. 

Website search services employing the Barlow method and the Parsons method are available. Today audio files can be plugged into music recognition services such as Audiggle, Gracenote, Shazam and SoundHound. Google's "Hum to Search" feature, introduced for mobile phones in 2020, uses artificial intelligence models and is based on Google's music recognition technology.

References

Reference works
Encyclopedias of music
Music theory
Acoustic fingerprinting
Music search engines
Plagiarism
1949 non-fiction books